Wolstenholme may refer to:

People with the surname
Andrew Wolstenholme (born 1959), British civil engineer, CEO of Crossrail
Chris Wolstenholme (born 1978), English bassist for the rock band Muse
Colleen Wolstenholme (born 1963), Canadian artist
Elizabeth Clarke Wolstenholme Elmy (1834-1918), British suffragist and campaigner
Eddie Wolstenholme (born c. 1954), English football referee
Gordon Wolstenholme (1913–2004), British medical doctor and founding director of the Ciba Foundation.
Guy Wolstenholme (1931–1984), English golfer
Ian Wolstenholme (born 1943), English amateur footballer
Jack Wolstenholme (1851–1914), New Zealand cricketer
Sir John Wolstenholme, 1st Baronet (c. 1596–1670), English politician and landowner (see baronets, below)
Jonathan Wolstenholme (born 1950), British artist and illustrator
Joseph Wolstenholme (1829-1891), British mathematician
Manjit Wolstenholme (1964–2017), British businesswoman, CEO of Provident Financial
Kenneth Wolstenholme (1920–2002), English football commentator
William Wolstenholme (1865–1931), English composer and organist

Places
Wolstenholme Towne, an English settlement from 1618–1622 in present-day Virginia, USA
Wolstenholme Bay, in NW Greenland
Wolstenholme Fjord, in NW Greenland
Wolstenholme Island, in NW Greenland

Titles
Wolstenholme baronets, a baronetcy in the Baronetage of England

Mathematics
Wolstenholme prime, a prime number satisfying a certain congruence
Wolstenholme number, a class of positive integers
Wolstenholme's theorem, a congruence for binomial coefficients